San Antonio de Benagéber, is a municipality in the comarca of Camp de Túria in the Valencian Community, Spain.

Geography

The municipality of San Antonio de Benagéber it is located at 14 km. of the city of Valencia.

Neighborhoods and districts 

In the municipality of San Antonio de Benagéber are also the following towns:
 Urbanización Montesano.
 Urbanización Colinas de San Antonio.
 Urbanización Cumbres de San Antonio.
 Urbanización de San Vicente.
 Zona del Pla del Pou

References

Municipalities in Camp de Túria
Populated places in Camp de Túria